The General Aircraft GAL.42 Cygnet II was a 1930s British single-engined training or touring aircraft built by General Aircraft Limited at London Air Park, Hanworth.

History
The Cygnet was designed at Slough by C.W. Aircraft Limited in 1936. It was the first all-metal stressed-skin lightplane to be built and flown in the United Kingdom. The prototype, powered by a  Cirrus Minor engine, and registration G-AEMA was first flown in May 1937 at London Air Park, Hanworth. It had a fixed tailwheel undercarriage and low cantilever wing with rounded wingtips and a split training edge flap that ran under the fuselage. Two persons sat side by side in an enclosed cabin with a reverse-sloped windscreen.  The metal airframe had a very slim semi-monocoque tailcone which carried the tailplane and a single, triangular fin and rudder. The prototype soon underwent a number of modifications, with the Cirrus Minor engine being replaced by a  de Havilland Gipsy Major engine, the cockpit canopy being revised to have a more conventional forward-sloped windscreen and the centre section of flap underneath the aircraft's fuselage removed. Thus modified, it was entered into the 1937 King's Cup Race on 10–11 September that year, finishing 13th. 

Airworthiness certification for the new type was slow, partially due to the Cygnet's extensive use of pop riveting, so that C.W. Aircraft made no sales of the Cygnet, while the company had also invested heavily in another design, the C.W. Swan, a six-seater to be powered by two de Havilland Gipsy Six engines. Overextended, C.W. aircraft became insolvent and was shut down in March 1938, with all rights for the Cygnet, together with the prototype, being sold to General Aircraft Ltd (GAL).

Now known as the GAL 42, the Cygnet was again entered into the King's Cup race on 2 July 1938, but ran of oil late in the race when challenging for the lead and had to retire. In November 1938, GAL modified the prototype Cygnet with a new tail assembly, with twin fins and rudders, to improve the efficiency of the aircraft's elevators. GAL further modified the prototype early in 1939 with a nosewheel undercarriage, which had already been tested on a Monospar ST-25, with the intention of making the aircraft as safe and easy to fly as possible. Tests proved successful, and production was launched of the GAL 42 Cygnet II. This had cantilever undercarriage legs with oleo struts rather than the braced undercarriage legs of the prototype, a deeper cabin with a sliding cockpit canopy which could be opened in flight, and a more powerful Cirrus Major engine, although the Gipsy Six remained an option and two Cygnet IIs were completed with this engine.
 
The first production aircraft, registration G-AFVR, was flying by July 1939. While production of a large batch of aircraft was planned, only 10 are reported to have been built due to the start of the Second World War, although no records are available for two of them, and it is possible that they may not have been completed. Five aircraft were impressed into service with the Royal Air Force as tricycle-undercarriage trainers for aircrews slated to man the American-made Douglas Boston and later as communications aircraft, while another, which was not impressed, was used by GAL as a communications aircraft.  Two aircraft were sold to South American customers (one in Brazil and one in Argentina) in 1941. 

A trainer version of the Cygnet II was designed with an open cockpit as the GAL.45 Owlet.

Surviving aircraft

There are two known survivors of the 11 examples produced.  The last flying survivor, company number 111 and registered as G-AGBN (ES915), was retired in 1988 and is now on display at the National Museum of Flight at East Fortune, Scotland. It was a part of the Strathallan Collection owned by Sir William 'Willy' James Denby Roberts until the dissolution of the collection. The National Museum of Flight failed to acquire it but the bidding was taken over by Victor Gauntlett who donated to the museum.

A civilian version was operated in south Argentina, in Tierra del Fuego province where it was damaged in a landing incident.  After being repaired and being flown for several years, it was landed at a short airstrip in Colón and was unable to depart therefrom.  It remained there and subsequently was converted into a monument at the Air Club entrance.  In 2008 it was reported to be in poor condition.

Military operators
 
 No. 418 Squadron RCAF
 
 Royal Air Force
 No. 23 Squadron RAF
 No. 24 Squadron RAF
 No. 85 Squadron RAF
 No. 88 Squadron RAF
 No. 510 Squadron RAF
 No. 530 Squadron RAF

Specifications (Cygnet II with Cirrus Major)

See also

References

Historic Aircraft Cygnet page
Museum of Flight Cygnet page

1930s British military trainer aircraft
Low-wing aircraft
Single-engined tractor aircraft
Cygnet
Aircraft first flown in 1937
Twin-tail aircraft